Need to Control is the second studio album by American grindcore band Brutal Truth, released on October 25, 1994 through Earache.

Background
Need to Control is the first album to feature drummer Richard Hoak who would remain in this position until the band officially disbanded in 2014. Scott Lewis, who played drums on predecessor album Extreme Conditions Demand Extreme Responses, had left before the recording of Need to Control. According to vocalist Kevin Sharp, one reason for the drummer's departing was that "Scott just really didn't like the touring thing."

Sharp cited his personal background in the punk movement as inspiration for recording the Germs's song "Media Blitz": "I always really liked the whole Germs concept. [...] It was like 'We can't really play our instruments but we want to be in a band and we're gonna compensate by being creative. [...] I was always inspired by that mentality, that punk mentality, and that's where I come from. So that's why I like the Germs and that's why we did that song." Mike Williams, singer of American sludge metal band Eyehategod and a friend of Sharpe, contributed vocals to the cover version: "Mike was in town when we recorded Need to Control."

Release
Need to Control was released on CD, cassette, and LP. A box set was also released, containing 5 records: one 5", one 6", one 7", one 8", and one 9". This box set, as well as the Japanese CD, contains four bonus tracks. On September 14, 2010 Earache released a redux edition of Need to Control, which included the bonus tracks from the Japanese release (except "B.T.I.T.B.") plus two more, along with an interview with vocalist Kevin Sharp.

Track listing

Personnel

Brutal Truth
 Dan Lilker – bass guitar
 Richard Hoak – drums
 Brent McCarthy – guitar
 Kevin Sharp – vocals

Additional musicians
 Mike Williams – vocals (9)
 Bill Yurkiewicz – vocals (2)
 Andy Haas – didgeridoo (4)

Technical personnel
 Steve McAllister – recording
 Colin Richardson – mixing
 Zmago Smon – engineering
 Dave Buchanan – assistant engineering
 Stephen Marcussen – mastering
 Patrick Aquintey – art direction
 Louis Gozik – cover art
 Eddie Bartolomei – photography

References

Brutal Truth albums
1994 albums
Earache Records albums